Muhammad Ramadan Oliver (born March 12, 1969) was an American football cornerback in the National Football League for the Denver Broncos, Green Bay Packers, Kansas City Chiefs, Miami Dolphins and Washington Redskins. He played college football at the University of Oregon.

Oliver is a former decathlete, who set his personal best score (8087 points) on June 6, 1992 at the NCAA championships in Austin, Texas.

His son, Isaiah Oliver, played college football at Colorado and now plays in the NFL for the Atlanta Falcons.

References

Decathlon Year Ranking

1969 births
Living people
Sportspeople from Brooklyn
Players of American football from New York City
American male decathletes
Denver Broncos players
Green Bay Packers players
Kansas City Chiefs players
Miami Dolphins players
Washington Redskins players
American football cornerbacks
Oregon Ducks football players
Oregon Ducks men's track and field athletes
Track and field athletes from New York City